Valvettithurai massacre may refer to:

1985 Valvettithurai massacre, carried out by the Sri Lankan Army in May 1985. 
1989 Valvettithurai massacre, carried out by the Indian Army (IPKF) in August 1989.